Deer Creek Township or know as Township No. seventy one (71) is a township in 
Mills County, Iowa, United States. Deer Creek Township is created by subdividing White Cloud Civil Township at a meeting of the Board of Supervisors held in the court house in Glenwood, Iowa, on the 5th September,1871. Deer Creek Township have population of 220 people on territory of 35.5 square miles with numbered 101 households.

First election in Deer Creek Township was held at the house of Stephen Woodow on 10 October 1871.

D. M. Mitchell was the first auditor and clerk in Deer Creek Township. Deer Creek Township was signed by B.F. Buffington, and D.M. Whitefield, members of the board of supervisors.

Dan Solomon is among the first people in Deer Creek Township that opened a farm known as Scott Farm.

References

Mills County, Iowa
Townships in Iowa